Tudor Grange Samworth Academy, A Church of England School, previously known as Samworth Enterprise Academy, is a school with Academy status located in Leicester, England. It is a co-educational school for 3-16 year olds that specialises in Food, Business and Enterprise. The school was created on the site of the Mary Linwood Comprehensive School which closed in 1997. It opened in 2007 under the co-sponsorship of the Church of England and businessman Sir David Samworth, and incorporates a fully functioning church.

The school became part of the Tudor Grange Academies Trust in January 2016.

Concerns and criticism

Inadequate rating and special measures
In September 2014, after poor GCSE results, the original head Pat Dubas resigned, and a new interim head was appointed. An Ofsted report in June 2015, classified the school as "inadequate in almost all areas" and placing it into special measures. The school was rated "inadequate" again in October 2018.

Alleged malpractice
In July 2016, a whistleblower alleged that the  members of staff had been engaging in malpractice by helping students during GCSE examinations and having access to examination papers prior to the start of public examinations. The claims are currently being investigated by the Joint Council for Qualifications.

OFSTED Inspections
After a flurry of monitoring visits to confirm that the school was indeed moving in the right direction, in November 2021, OFSTED returned and carried out a full section 5 inspection finding that the school had rapidly improved in all areas to GOOD and is now categorised as a GOOD school. 

OFSTED noted that 'Leaders and staff build the school’s values of tolerance, unity, democracy, opportunity and respect (TUDOR) into all aspects of the school’s work. Pupils say that they are safe and happy at school. They are very well cared for by staff, who are proud to work at this school.'

See also
Samworth Church Academy

References

External links
Tudor Grange Samworth Academy official website
Westminster Academy review and photos by a+t magazine

Educational institutions established in 2007
Academies in Leicester
Primary schools in Leicester
Secondary schools in Leicester
Church of England primary schools in the Diocese of Leicester
Church of England secondary schools in the Diocese of Leicester
2007 establishments in England